Jõgeva is a small town in Estonia with a population of around 5000 people. It is the capital of Jõgeva Parish and Jõgeva County.

History 
Jõgeva was first mentioned in 1599 as Jagiwa manor, being established only recently on the lands of the same named village by the orders of the Polish king. During the Polish reign in Estonia (1582–1622) it was part of Laiuse starostwo, which became Laiuse fief during Swedish rule (1622–1721).

In 1756, Jõgeva manor became the property of Gotthard Johann von Manteuffel (1690–1763) and remained in the family of von Manteuffel until 1919 when it was nationalized by the government. In 1876, a railway station, named Laisholm after the manor, was established near the village of Jõgeva. The owner of Jõgeva manor, Ernst Gotthard von Manteuffel (1844–1922), started renting out land around the railway station in 1903. After that, the village grew quickly. On October 13, 1919, Jõgeva became a borough and on May 1, 1938, a town.

During the Second World War nearly 60% of the town was destroyed.

During the Soviet occupation of Estonia Jõgeva became an important administrative center with several big industries. Many new administrative, commercial and residential buildings were erected at that time.

Location
Jõgeva is situated on the right shore of Pedja River which flows through the city from north to south. Parallel with the river is the Tallinn–Tartu railway line.

Nature and climate
Jõgeva is located between big drumlins. The hill of Laiuse is located east from the town. River Pedja passes through the town.
The town has Humid continental climate (Dfb). Winters are usually snowy and cold. Summers are warm and often humid, some days the maximum can reach 30- 35C. Thunder season starts in April and ends usually in the end of October.

Culture
In July Jõgevatreff, an annual bikers reunion takes place. The culmination of the event is the parade of the bikers through the town. In August, the annual Garlic Festival is held.
Jõgeva is also regarded as the headquarters of the Estonian Santa Claus.

Sights and buildings
The house museum of Estonian poet Betti Alver - the house by the railway station where she was born;
Külmasammas - a monument marking the Estonian cold record of  recorded in Jõgeva in 1940;
The Estonian War of Independence memorial stone to commemorate the casualties;
The memorial to the casualties of the Second World War;
The memorial to the Estonian deportees during Soviet occupation in 1941 and 1949;

International relations

Twin towns - Sister cities
The former municipality of Jõgeva was twinned with:
 Jonava, Lithuania
 Kaarina, Finland
 Karlstad, Sweden
 Keuruu, Finland

Gallery

Notable people
Vallo Allingu (born 1978), basketball player, born in Jõgeva.
Saskia Alusalu (born 1994), speed skater, born in Jõgeva.
Betti Alver (1906–1989), poet, born in Jõgeva.
Ain Evard (born 1962) high jumper, born in Jõgeva. 
Robin Kool  (aka "ropz"; born 1999), esports player, born in Jõgeva.  
Aire Koop (born 1957), actress, born in Jõgeva.
Alo Kõrve (born 1978), actor, born in Jõgeva. 
Hele Kõrve (born 1980), actress, born in Jõgeva. 
Alo Mattiisen (1961–1996), musician and composer, born in Jõgeva.
Mati Meos (born 1946), engineer and politician, born in Jõgeva. 
Erki Pütsep (born 1976), road bicycle racer, born in Jõgeva. 
Tiit Sukk (born 1974), actor, born in Jõgeva.
Alar Varrak (born 1982), basketball player and coach, born in Jõgeva.
Luule Viilma (1950–2002), physician, esotericist and parapsychologist, born in Jõgeva.
Igor Volke (born 1950), ufologist and author, born in Jõgeva.

See also
Jõgeva SK Noorus-96
FC Jõgeva Wolves

References
Notes

External links

Webcamera in Jõgeva center

 
Cities and towns in Estonia
Former municipalities of Estonia
Populated places in Jõgeva County
Kreis Dorpat
16th-century establishments in Estonia
Populated places established in the 16th century